Pacôme Rupin (born 25 January 1985) is a French politician who served as a member of the National Assembly from 2017 to 2022, representing the 7th constituency of Paris. A member of La République En Marche! (LREM), his constituency covers the 4th arrondissement, as well as parts of the 11th and 12th arrondissements.

Political career
From 2005 until 2016, Rupin was a member of the Socialist Party. He joined LREM shortly after its launch in 2016.

Upon entering Parliament, Rupin was one of the four deputy chairpersons of the LREM parliamentary group under the leadership of successive chairmen Richard Ferrand (2017–2018) and Gilles Le Gendre (2018–2022). He also served on the Committee on Legal Affairs. In late 2018, he launched an informal group on Grand Paris.

Ahead of the 2020 Paris municipal election, Rupin led a 12-person steering committee set up to prepare the LREM campaign and later served as campaign director for candidate Benjamin Griveaux.

Political positions
In July 2019, Rupin voted in favor of the French ratification of the European Union’s Comprehensive Economic and Trade Agreement (CETA) with Canada.

Personal life
Rupin lives in a civil union with his partner.

See also
 2017 French legislative election

References

1985 births
Living people
Deputies of the 15th National Assembly of the French Fifth Republic
La République En Marche! politicians
Gay politicians
LGBT legislators in France
Politicians from Tours, France
Saint-Jean de Passy alumni
ESSEC Business School alumni